SAS Galeshewe was a  of the South African Navy, configured as an Offshore Patrol Vessel before being decommissioned in 2020.

She was commissioned in 1983 and originally named SAS Hendrik Mentz for South African Party minister of defence Hendrik Mentz, she was renamed on 1 April 1997. She was upgraded in 2012/2013 to an Offshore Patrol Vessel role.

Before decommissioning, the SAS Galeshewe was used for anti piracy patrols.

References

1982 ships
Missile boats of the South African Navy
Military units and formations in Durban